Dimitri Lauwers (born 30 April 1979) is a Belgian professional basketball player. He also played for the Belgian national basketball team at EuroBasket 2011.

Professional career
In the 1997 he made his debut with the BC Oostende and in 1998 he won the Belgian Cup.
After three season he left the team and went to play in France, where he played with three teams (Le Mans, Cholet and Dijon) and won the French Leaders Cup in 2004.
Then he moved to Italy to play with Teramo, Scafati, Virtus Bologna, Varese and Avellino and he won the LegaDue championship for two times (in 2006 and 2009) and the LegaDue Cup (in 2006).
In 2012 he came back to the BC Oostende and won the Belgian League.
In 2013 he returned to play in Italy and he played for Scaligera Verona and Sutor Montegranaro.
He currently plays for Recanati.

External links
 Dimitri Lauwers at FIBA.com.
 Dimitri Lauwers at legabasket.it 

1979 births
Living people
BC Oostende players
Belgian men's basketball players
Belgium national basketball players
Cholet Basket players
JDA Dijon Basket players
Le Mans Sarthe Basket players
Pallacanestro Varese players
S.S. Felice Scandone players
Scafati Basket players
Scaligera Basket Verona players
Sutor Basket Montegranaro players
Teramo Basket players
Virtus Bologna players
Shooting guards